E.T. the Extra-Terrestrial: Music from the Original Soundtrack is the score to the 1982 film of the same name composed and conducted by John Williams. The album was first released by MCA Records on June 11, 1982. It won the Academy Award for Best Original Score and Grammy Award for Best Score Soundtrack for Visual Media. The album was reissued in expanded form in 1996, and again in a slightly more expanded edition in 2002, before being remastered and reissued in a limited-edition two-disc set by La-La Land Records on September 26, 2017.

Overview
The soundtrack for the film has been issued numerous times. The original 1982 album release was a recording of concert arrangements based on the film's music, whereas later issues contain the actual soundtrack cues as heard in the film, although most cues are alternates originally recorded for the film, but replaced by new cues.

The score was recorded at the MGM Scoring Stage in Culver City, California.

On the track "The Magic of Halloween," when E.T. sees a child wearing a Yoda costume, Williams includes a reference to "Yoda's Theme", which he had composed for The Empire Strikes Back in 1980. In 1999, George Lucas made the final link when he included three E.T.s as members of the senate in Star Wars: Episode I – The Phantom Menace (also composed by John Williams) and thereby semiconnecting the two movies.

The music
There are almost 80 minutes of music excluding alternates and album arrangements recorded just for the film. In paper the total number of full score  excluding instrument parts excess well over 500 pages. The music was first written on a sketch to later be handed to orchestrator Herbert W. Spencer, who penciled out the full score from December 1981 to January 1982. 

The orchestra consist of that of a usual standard orchestra with variations, e.g. the end credits consist of 3 flutes, 2 oboes, 2 clarinets, 3 bassoons, 4 horn in f, 3 trumpets, 3 trombones, 1 tuba, percussion section, 1 harp, 1 piano and string section. Other parts of the movie required additional instruments such as celeste and organ. During the recording several of the woodwind players also play doubles between their own instrument and  piccolo flute, English horn, and a clarinet, and contra bassoon.

Several revisions to the music were made before the final film score was ready. Some of the original versions of the music would end up on the original soundtrack album along with new recordings while others would end up on either the 1996 or 2002 releases before La La Land Records finally released the original film score including all alternate versions of the cues were presented as bonus material.

One of the known anecdotes from the recording is that Williams had problems with timing of the music during the recording of the finale chase which resulted in Spielberg shutting off the projector and telling Williams to record the music as he wanted it. Spielberg later edited the scenes around the recorded music.

Track listing

Awards
The score was the fourth in history to accomplish the feat of winning the Academy Award, Golden Globe, Grammy, and BAFTA. (The previous two, Star Wars and Jaws, were also composed by Williams, who remains the only person to have won all awards for the same score more than once.)  To date, a total of only six scores have won all four awards.

References

Bibliography

1982 soundtrack albums
1980s film soundtrack albums
John Williams soundtracks
Albums produced by Bruce Botnick
MCA Records soundtracks
Soundtrack
Grammy Award for Best Score Soundtrack for Visual Media
La-La Land Records soundtracks
Science fiction film soundtracks
Scores that won the Best Original Score Academy Award